Raúl Martínez Solares was a Mexican cinematographer. He began his career during the Golden Age of Mexican cinema.

Selected filmography
 The Coward (1939)
 The Lieutenant Nun (1944)
 Tragic Wedding (1946)
 The Associate (1946)
 The Thief (1947)
 Adventure in the Night (1948)
 Nocturne of Love (1948)
 The Genius (1948)
 Philip of Jesus (1949)
 The Magician (1949)
 The Woman of the Port (1949)
 The Two Orphans (1950)
 Immaculate (1950)
 History of a Heart (1951)
 The Masked Tiger (1951)
 They Say I'm a Communist (1951)
 Women's Prison (1951)
 The Beautiful Dreamer (1952)
 Seven Women (1953)
 You Had To Be a Gypsy (1953)
 Made for Each Other (1953)
 The Vagabond (1953)
 The Bandits of Cold River (1956)
 Raffles (1958)
 The White Renegade (1960)
 The Miracle Roses (1960)
 The White Sister (1960)
 House of Terror (1960)
 Romance in Puerto Rico (1962)
 The She-Wolf (1965)

References

Bibliography 
 Raymond Durgnat. Luis Bunuel. University of California Press, 1977.

External links 
 
Raúl Martínez Solares - AMACC

Year of birth unknown
Year of death unknown
Mexican cinematographers